Euriphene aridatha, the dark nymph, is a butterfly in the family Nymphalidae. It is found in Sierra Leone, Liberia, Ivory Coast, Ghana, Togo, Nigeria and Cameroon. The habitat consists of forests.

Subspecies
Euriphene aridatha aridatha (Nigeria, western Cameroon)
Euriphene aridatha camerunica d’Abrera, 2004 (Cameroon)
Euriphene aridatha feronia (Staudinger, 1891) (Sierra Leone, Liberia, western Ivory Coast)
Euriphene aridatha transgressa Hecq, 1994 (eastern Ivory Coast, Ghana, Togo)

References

Butterflies described in 1866
Euriphene
Butterflies of Africa
Taxa named by William Chapman Hewitson